Katia Canciani (born February 16, 1971) is a Canadian writer and aviator originally from Blainville, Quebec. She was awarded the Governor General's Award for French-language children's illustration for the novel Pet et Répète: La véritable histoire at the 2020 Governor General's Awards.

Biography 
Katia Canciani was born in 1971 to a Breton mother who emigrated to Canada at the age of six, and to a Gascon father who went to Canada to visit Expo 67 in Montreal.  She grew up in the city of Blainville, a suburb of Montreal, Quebec.  She left home at 17 years old to pursue her studies at the Centre Québécois de Formation Aéronautique du Cégep de Chicoutimi where she obtained her professional pilot's license in 1991.  She taught flight and aerobatics in Manitoba until 1995, then in Quebec in the summer of 1997.

Canciani lived in Ottawa, Ontario for several years and worked for Transport Canada’s Civil Aviation’s Contingency and Emergency Planning division.  In 2019, she was elected Chair of the NATO Transport Group Civil Aviation (TGCA), for a three-year term.  She currently resides in Brussels, Belgium.

Works 
Canciani has authored more than 47 novels and children's books.  Her first novel, Un jardin en Espagne was published in 2006 and was a finalist for the Prix des lecteurs Radio-Canada. Her novel 178 secondes, was winner of the 2010 Prix littéraire des enseignants du Québec in the novel 15 years and over category.  She has also published Lettre à Saint-Exupéry, an epistolary novel in which she recounts her journey as a writer, pilot, and mother.

Novels 

 2006 – Un jardin en Espagne. Retour au Généralife (David) 
 2009 – Lettre à Saint-Exupéry (Fides) 
 2015 – 178 secondes (David)

Children's books 

 2007 – Riquili apprend à compter (Bouton D’or Acadie) 
 2007 – Crinière au vent: Si j’avais un poney... (Hurtubise) 
 2007 – Samuel la tornade (Bayard) 
 2008 – Poussièra (Bayard) 
 2008 – Crinière au vent: Un camp mystère... (Hurtubise) 
 2008 – Kimmy la lune (Bayard) 
 2008 – Le château qui puait trop (Bouton D’or Acadie) 
 2008 – Riquili apprend les voyelles (Bouton D’or Acadie) 
 2009 – La princesse Pop Corn (Bayard) 
 2009 – Riquili apprend les consonnes (Bouton D’or Acadie) 
 2009 – Frédéric le méli-mêlé (Bayard) 
 2009 – La grande bataille (Bayard) 
 2010 – Crinière au vent: Poney en cavale (Hurtubise) 
 2010 – La bataille au sommet (Bayard) 
 2010 – Rosalie la ronde (Bayard) 
 2010 – Karim le kaki (Bayard) 
 2010 – Girofle déménage (ERPI) 
 2010 – Le secret des diamants (Bayard) 
 2011 – Les aventures de Sam Chicotte: Les baleines des Îles-de-la-Madeleine (Bayard) 
 2011 – Les aventures de Sam Chicotte: La potion du Grand Nord (Bayard) 
 2012 – Un écureuil coquin (ERPI) 
 2012 – La bataille d’oreillers (Bayard) 
 2012 – Léon la cible (Bayard) 
 2012 – Les aventures de Sam Chicotte: Les crapauds de Fort Lennox (Bayard) 
 2012 – Les aventures de Sam Chicotte: La lumière de New York (Bayard) 
 2012 – Les aventures de Sam Chicotte: Le talisman du Mexique (Bayard) 
 2012 – Les aventures de Sam Chicotte: Le trèfle d’Irlande (Bayard) 
 2013 – La bataille des plaines (Bayard) 
 2013 – Billy la bulle: Mon meilleur ami (Bayard) 
 2013 – Pilote en détresse (Magazine "J'aime lire" en France)
 2014 – L’envolée d’Antoine (l’Isatis) 
 2014 – Le Dromadaire au nez rouge (Soulières) 
 2015 – Le voyage en Chine (Bayard) 
 2015 – Courage, Dafné! (Ma Bulle) 
 2015 – Mirmaëlle, fée des dents: Une mission sans peur (Bayard) 
 2015 – Pique la lune (l’Isatis) 
 2016 – Mirmaëlle, fée des dents: Un Noël surprenant (Bayard) 
 2017 – Théo, apprenti détective (Bayard) 
 2018 – L’attaque du Voletor (Magazine "J'aime lire" en France)
 2018 – L’attaque du Griffetor (Bayard) 
 2019 – Le multiplicator de Pâques (Bayard) 
 2019 – La cabane (Bouton d'or Acadie) 
 2019 – Pet et Répète: La véritable histoire (Fonfon) 
 2019 – Sonia d’Or, 1. Si j’avais un poney… (Hachette) 
 2019 – Sofia et le marchand ambulant (Les 400 coups) 
 2019 – Édouard, chausseurs de monstres: Le multiplicator de Pâques (Bayard) 
 2020 – Sonia d'Or, 2. Un camp mystère (Hachette) 
 2020 – The Ice Shack (Breakwater Books)

Awards and honours 
Pet et Répète: La véritable histoire, illustrated by Guillaume Perreault, Fonfon (2019)

 Prix littéraire Mélèze in 2021
 Governor General's Award for French-language children's illustration, laureate in 2020

Sofia et le marchand ambulant, illustrated by Antoine Desprez, Les 400 coups (2019)

 Prix Saint-Exupéry – Volet Jeunesse – Francoponie, recipient in 2020
 Prix littéraire Chronos, finalist in 2021
 Prix littéraire Peuplier, finalist in 2021
 Prix littéraire Tatoulu, finalist in 2021

Théo, apprenti détective, illustrated by Jean Morin, Bayard (2017)

 Prix littéraire Tamarac Express - Forêt de la lecture, finalist in 2018

Pique la lune, illustrations de Félix Girard,  l’Isatis (2015)

 Prix littéraire Tamarac Express - Forêt de la lecture, finalist in 2017

Le voyage en Chine illustrated by Félix Girard, l’Isatis (2015)

 Prix littéraire Tamarac Express - Forêt de la lecture, finalist in 2016

Samuel la tornade, illustrated by Christine Battuz, Bayard (2007)

 Prix Communication et société, catégorie jeunesse in 2009

Poussièra, illustrated by Julie Cossette, Bayard (2008)

 Prix littéraire France-Acadie, finalist in 2009

References

External links 
 

21st-century Canadian women writers
Canadian children's writers in French
French Quebecers
Governor General's Award-winning children's illustrators
Living people
Writers from Quebec
1971 births